This is the discography of American rock band Styx. Over the years they have released 17 studio albums, 9 live albums, 16 compilation albums, 39 singles, and 3 extended plays. 16 singles have hit the top 40 of the U.S. Billboard Hot 100 and 8 have hit the top 10.

Studio albums

Live albums

Compilation albums

Extended plays

Singles

Notes

References

External links
Official discography of Styx

Discographies of American artists
Rock music group discographies